Acer cordatum is an Asian species of maple. It has been found only in China.

Acer cordatum is a small tree up to 10 meters tall. Leaves are non-compound, either unlobed or with 2 or 3 lobes.

Varieties
Acer cordatum var. cordatum  - leaves not lobed - Anhui, Fujian, Guangdong, Guangxi, Guizhou, Hainan, Hubei, Hunan, Jiangxi, Sichuan, Yunnan, Zhejiang
Acer cordatum var. dimorphifolium (F.P.Metcalf) Y.S.Chen  - leaves each with 2 or 3 lobes -- Fujian, Guangdong, Jiangxi

References

cordatum
Plants described in 1889
Flora of China